Johann Bernhard Wilhelm Lindenberg (18 September 1781 – 6 June 1851) was a German bryologist who worked as a lawyer in Bergedorf (today a burrough of Hamburg).

He was a native of Lübeck, and studied law at the Universities of Jena and Göttingen. Lindenberg specialized in research of liverworts, and with Christian Gottfried Daniel Nees von Esenbeck (1776–1858) and Carl Moritz Gottsche (1808–1892) was author of an important treatise on hepaticology titled Synopsis Hepaticarum (1844–47).

The plant genus Lindenbergia from the family Orobanchaceae is named in his honor.

References 
  translated biography @ Allgemeine Deutsche Biographie
 The Standard Cyclopedia of Horticulture by Liberty Hyde Bailey

Bryologists
19th-century German botanists
Scientists from Lübeck
1781 births
1851 deaths